Kristina McMorris is an American author of five novels and two novellas.

McMorris's debut novel, Letters from Home, was originally inspired by her grandparents' WWII courtship letters. The book was a 2013 nominee for the RITA Award.

Kristina's novels have since included The Edge of Lost,  and Sold on a Monday.

Works

Novels
 Letters from Home (2011)
 Bridge of Scarlet Leaves (2012)
 The Pieces We Keep (2013)
 The Edge of Lost (2015)
 Sold on a Monday (2018)

Novellas/Anthologies
 "The Christmas Collector" in A Winter Wonderland (2012)
 "The Reunion" in Grand Central (2014)

Notes

External links

Kristina McMorris at goodreads

Living people
American romantic fiction writers
Year of birth missing (living people)